Tuareg rebellion may refer to various armed conflicts involving the Tuareg people of the northern parts of Mali and Niger:

Kaocen revolt (1916–1917)
Tuareg rebellion (1962–1964)
Tuareg rebellion (1990–1995)
Tuareg rebellion (2007–2009)
Tuareg rebellion (2012)
Tuareg involvement in the Northern Mali conflict (2012–)
Tuareg involvement in the Second Libyan Civil War (2014–2020)

See also
Ansar Dine
Movement for Oneness and Jihad in West Africa
Tuareg militias of Ghat